Talladega College is a private historically black college in Talladega, Alabama. It is Alabama's oldest private historically black college and offers 17 degree programs. It is accredited by the Southern Association of Colleges and Schools.

History 
The history of Talladega College began on November 20, 1865, when three former slaves William Savery, Thomas Tarrant, and Ambrose Headen of Talladega, met in convention with a group of new freedmen in Mobile, Alabama. From this meeting came the commitment, "We regard the education of our children and youth as vital to the preservation of our liberties, and true religion as the foundation of all real virtue, and shall use our utmost endeavors to promote these blessings in our common country."

With this as their pledge, Savery, Tarrant, and Headen aided by General Wager Swayne of the Freedmen's Bureau, began in earnest to provide a school for the children of former slaves of the community. Their leadership resulted in the construction of a one-room school house using lumber salvaged from an abandoned carpenter's shop. The school overflowed with pupils from its opening and soon it was necessary to move into larger quarters.

Meanwhile, the nearby Coosa River Valley Baptist Academy was about to be sold under mortgage default. This building had been built in 1852–53 with the help of slaves, including Savery, Tarrant, and Headen. A speedy plea was sent to General Swayne for its purchase.

The grateful parents renamed the building Swayne School and it opened in November 1867 with about 140 pupils. A building constructed before the war with slave labor for white students became the home of the state's first college dedicated to serving the educational needs of blacks. In 1869, Swayne School was issued a charter as Talladega College by the Judge of Probate of Talladega County.

The former Baptist Academy building, now known as Swayne Hall, has remained in service as the symbol and spirit of the beginning of the college.

Campus 

Talladega College is located in the city of Talladega. The Savery Library, completed in 1939, was built to replace a 1907 structure built with a donation from Andrew Carnegie. The library houses hundreds of thousands of serials, a Record Room, a fully equipped computer laboratory, a unique Archives Room, and the historic Amistad murals painted by Hale Woodruff. Embedded in the floor of the library is a mural of La Amistad - which school tradition says must never be stepped upon - referring to the mutiny by slaves, who took control of that ship and later won their freedom in a United States court, is depicted upon the surrounding walls. The mezzanine floor of the library houses the Galangue Room. This room contains an extensive collection of Angolan and Nigerian artifacts.

Andrews Hall, built in 1910, houses the Music Department and the Education Department. It is named for George Whitfield Andrews, D.D., Dean of the Theological Department from 1875 to 1908.

Arthur D. Shores Hall, constructed in 1974, is named for the late attorney Arthur D. Shores, Class of 1927, who served for many years as a member and chairman of the College Board of Trustees.

De Forest Chapel was built in 1903 in commemoration of the life and service of the Rev. Henry Swift De Forest, D.D., President of the college from 1879 to 1896. DeForest Chapel was renovated in 1996 and rededicated November 1996. De Forest was the father of inventor Lee De Forest.

Dr. William R. Harvey Museum of Art was founded in 2014 and opened in 2020. The showcase piece of the collection is the Amistad Mutiny murals by Hale Woodruff

Fanning Refectory was built in 1928 from a legacy of Dr. David H. Fanning of Worcester, Massachusetts. The building contains the student and faculty dining rooms.

Juliette Derricotte House, built in 1940–41, was the gift of the Harkness Foundation and named for Juliette Derricotte, Class of 1918, who at the time of her death in 1932 was a member of the Board of Trustees. Formerly a staff residence and guest house, it was converted into a women's honors dormitory in 1988.

Silsby Science Hall, constructed in 1926, was named for Dr. E. C. Silsby, who was a member of the college faculty for 37 years. The building was a gift of the General Education Board and friends and alumni of the college.  It contains the laboratories and classrooms for the Natural Sciences and Mathematics.

The Dr. Billy C. Hawkins Student Activity Center completed in 2020, was named after the 20th president of Talladega College.  The 47,000 square-foot state-of-the-art facility includes a 2,000-seat gymnasium, dining hall, full kitchen, concession stand, coffee lounge, convenience store, fitness area, and multipurpose rooms.

Athletics 
The Talladega athletic teams are called the Tornadoes. The college is a member of the National Association of Intercollegiate Athletics (NAIA), primarily competing in the Southern States Athletic Conference (SSAC; formerly known as Georgia–Alabama–Carolina Conference (GACC) until after the 2003–04 school year) since the 2021–22 academic year. The Tornadoes previously competed in the Gulf Coast Athletic Conference (GCAC) from 1999–2000 to 2001–02, and from 2011–12 to 2020–21.

Talladega competes in 15 intercollegiate varsity sports: Men's sports include baseball, basketball, cross country, soccer and track & field (indoor and outdoor); while women's sports include basketball, cross country, soccer, softball, track & field (indoor and outdoor) and volleyball; and co-ed sports include competitive cheer and competitive dance. Former sports included men's & women's golf.

Marching band 
The Talladega College Tornado Marching Band (The Great Tornado) was established in 2012. The marching band is the largest organization on campus, with over 200 members.  The band is led by five drum majors and is accompanied by a danceline named "Dega Diamonds". The marching band made their debut appearance at the annual Honda Battle of the Bands in 2015 and performed at the 2017 U.S. presidential inauguration parade in Washington, D.C. The band has also performed halftime for the New Orleans Saints in 2016, 2017, & 2021.

Notable alumni

References

Further reading
 Jones, Maxine D., and Joe M. Richardson. Talladega College: The First Century ( University of Alabama Press, 1990). online
 Jones, Maxine D. "Student Unrest at Talladega College, 1887-1914."  Journal of Negro History 70.3-4 (1985): 73-81. online

External links 

 
 Official athletics website

 
Historically black universities and colleges in the United States
Liberal arts colleges in Alabama
Education in Talladega County, Alabama
Universities and colleges accredited by the Southern Association of Colleges and Schools
Universities and colleges affiliated with the United Church of Christ
Educational institutions established in 1867
Buildings and structures in Talladega County, Alabama
American Missionary Association
Schools supported by the Freedmen's Bureau
Private universities and colleges in Alabama
1867 establishments in Alabama